Eduard Isaakovich Dubinski (Eduard Isaakovych Dubynskyi; 19 April 1935 in Kharkiv – 11 May 1969 in Moscow) was a Ukrainian and Soviet football defender who was best known for suffering a horrific injury at the 1962 FIFA World Cup that contributed to his death.

Biography
Born in Kharkiv to a Jewish family, Dubinski played as a sweeper or a full-back and was a member of the Soviet Union national football team in the 1960s, going on to win a total of 12 caps. In 1962, two years after the Soviets won the initial European Nations Cup, Dubinsky played at the 1962 FIFA World Cup in Chile. In the first match of the preliminary round, Dubinsky's leg was broken by Yugoslav Muhamed Mujić (who was not penalised for the foul, but later suspended by his team).  (a form of cancer), which eventually contributed to his death a number of years later.

References

External links
Profile in Russian

1935 births
1969 deaths
Footballers from Kharkiv
Ukrainian footballers
Soviet footballers
Jewish footballers
Soviet Union international footballers
1962 FIFA World Cup players
1964 European Nations' Cup players
FC Lokomotyv Kharkiv players
PFC CSKA Moscow players
SKA Kiev players
SKA Odesa players
FC Metallurg Lipetsk players
Association football defenders
Jewish Ukrainian sportspeople